A private pilot licence (PPL) or, in the United States, a private pilot certificate, is a type of pilot licence that allows the holder to act as pilot in command of an aircraft privately (not for remuneration). The licence requirements are determined by the International Civil Aviation Organisation (ICAO), but implementation varies widely from country to country. According to the ICAO, it is obtained by successfully completing a course with at least 40 hours (45 in Europe) of flight time, passing a written exam, completing a solo cross-country flight (minimum cumulative solo flight time is 10 hours), and successfully demonstrating flying skills to an examiner during a flight test (including an oral exam). In the United States, pilots can be trained under Part 141 of Title 14 of the Code of Federal Regulations, which allows them to apply for their certificate after as few as 35 hours. However, most pilots require 60–70 hours of flight time to complete their training. The minimum age for a student pilot certificate is 14 for balloons and gliders and 16 for powered flight (airplanes, helicopters, and gyroplanes). The minimum age for a private pilot certificate is 16 for balloons and gliders, and 17 for powered flight (airplanes, helicopters, and gyroplanes). Pilots can begin training at any age and can solo balloons and gliders from age 14 and powered aircraft from age 16.

Issuing authorities 
A PPL may be issued by the civil aviation authority in many countries such as the FAA for US certification, the CASA for Australian certification, or Transport Canada for Canadian certification. In Europe, civil aviation authorities issue a licence based on common EASA regulations. Each organization has slightly different requirements.

Categories and classes 

Different types of private licences are issued for the major categories of aircraft. It is possible to obtain a category rating to pilot a glider, rotorcraft, or lighter-than-air machine without ever flying a fixed-wing aircraft.  Some category/class ratings may include limitations placed on the certificate. For example, a lighter-than-air pilot with a balloon class rating will have the limitation "limited to hot air balloons with airborne heater" or "limited to gas balloons" unless he has logged the appropriate flight training in the other type of balloon and received a logbook endorsement which can then be inspected by the civil aviation authority when required.   Similarly, a pilot trained in multi-engine aircraft with tandem engines, such as the Cessna Skymaster, will receive a multi-engine land class rating with a "Centerline thrust only" endorsement.  This limitation will be removed upon meeting the standards for piloting an aircraft with engines on each wing. Other limitations may occasionally be issued, however these are not commonly encountered.

The structure of aircraft categories and further subdivision into classes are as follows:
 Airplane
 Single-engine land
 Single-engine sea
 Multi-engine land
 Multi-engine sea
 Rotorcraft
 Helicopter
 Gyroplane
 Glider
 Lighter-than-air
 Airship
 Balloon
 Powered-lift
 Powered parachute
 Powered parachute land
 Powered parachute sea
 Weight-shift-control
 Weight-shift-control land
 Weight-shift-control sea

Ratings 
A licence will contain a number of sub-qualifications or ratings. These specify in more detail the actual privileges of the licence, including the types of aircraft that can be flown, whether flight under instrument flight rules and at night is allowed, and whether instructing and examining of trainee pilots is authorized.  Ratings include Single and/or Multi-Engine Aircraft, Land or Seaplane, each of which require a checkride with an approved examiner.

Additional endorsements 
In addition, a number of endorsements are available for specific skills (additional requirements apply). Endorsements only require instruction and a Flight Instructor's endorsement, they do not require any flight test with an FAA representative and are placed in the pilot's logbook, not on the licence itself.

Sec. 61.31 Federal Aviation Regulations endorsements required to act as pilot-in-command (PIC) are:
 Tailwheel (pilots who have logged pilot-in-command time on tailwheel aircraft prior to 15 April 1991 are exempt from this requirement) – Tailwheel endorsement not applicable in Canada
 Complex airplane (aircraft with a variable-pitch propeller, flaps, and retractable landing gear)
 High-performance (more than 200 horsepower per engine)
 Pressurized aircraft endorsement for aircraft that have a service ceiling or maximum operating altitude, whichever is lower, above 25,000 feet MSL (mean sea level). 
 Night vision goggle operations
Other aircraft operations for which the FAA does not require an endorsement that typically require additional training are glider towing and aerobatics. The FAA also does not require an endorsement for some commercial activities like banner towing. Aerial application (crop seeding, spraying and dusting), whether conducted by a commercial certificate holder operating for hire or by a private pilot treating a crop in which he is the owner of a substantial share, requires an Authorization under Part 137 of the Federal Aviation Regulations.

See also
 Commercial pilot license
 Pilot licensing and certification
 Pilot licensing in Canada
 Pilot licensing in the United Kingdom
 Pilot certification in the United States
 Private aviation
 Australian PPL

References

External links
FAA Registry: Airmen Certification Inquiry
Private Pilot Practical Test Standards for Airplane (FAA, August 2002)
Computer Testing Supplement for Recreational Pilot and Private Pilot (FAA, 2004)

Aviation licenses and certifications